The Colombian National Road Race Championship is a road bicycle race that takes place inside the Colombian National Cycling Championship, and decides the best cyclist in this type of race. The first edition took place in 1946. The first race winner of the road race championship was Jaime Gómez. Efraín Forero holds the record for the most wins in the men's championship with 4. Esteban Chaves is the currently champion.

Men

Elite

Under 23

Women

Elite

Under 23

References

External links 
Past winners on cyclingarchives.com

National road cycling championships
Cycle races in Colombia
Recurring sporting events established in 1985
1985 establishments in Colombia
Cycling